U.S. Route 62 (US 62) in Kentucky runs for a total of  across 20 counties in western, north-central, and northeastern Kentucky. It enters the state by crossing the Ohio River near Wickliffe, then begins heading eastward at Bardwell, and traversing several cities and towns across the state up to Maysville, where it crosses the Ohio River a second time to enter the state of Ohio.

Route description

Wickliffe to Elizabethtown
US 62's runs concurrently with US 51 for its first  in Ballard and Carlisle counties in the Jackson Purchase region of southwestern Kentucky. US 62 separates from US 51 at Bardwell, where it turns northeastward towards Paducah. It then intersects Interstate 24 (I-24) near the Kentucky Welcome Center, and it runs concurrently with US 45 and US 60, along with parts of the I-24 Business Loop in downtown Paducah.

After entering Marshall County, US 62 continues eastward to cross I-24 two more times, the second time before traversing Kentucky Dam and into southern Livingston County. The third time US 62 crosses I-24 is near Eddyville during its concurrency with US 641 in Lyon County.

It then intersects I-69 (Western Kentucky Parkway) east of Eddyville before entering Caldwell County. US 62 closely follows the Western Kentucky Parkway (also known to locals as the WK Parkway) through Caldwell, Hopkins, Muhlenberg, Ohio, Grayson, and Hardin counties. The route traverses several towns and cities such as Princeton, Dawson Springs, Greenville, and Central City. In Muhlenberg County from Greenville to Central City, the US Route closely follows the four-lane Kentucky Route 189 (KY 189), which carries through traffic around the city of Powderly while US 62 traverses the urban areas of the three cities. Near Beaver Dam, US 62 does cross I-165 (formerly the William H. Natcher Parkway), but without access to that freeway. The route continues eastward into Grayson County towards Caneyville, Leitchfield, and Clarkson before reaching Elizabethtown.

Elizabethtown to Maysville
After reaching Elizabethtown, it has a concurrency with KY 61, crossing exit 94 on I-65, and into Nelson County. US 62 begins to parallel the Bluegrass Parkway, and it does so all the way to Versailles. Beyond Versailles, US 62 turns northeastward to cross I-64 and reaches Georgetown.

US 62 continues on a northeasterly track into the northwesternmost corner of Bourbon County before entering Harrison County. It then traverses towns such as Cynthiana, Oddville, and Mt. Olivet, before reaching Maysville. There, it runs concurrently with US 68 Business into downtown Maysville (the main alignment of US 68 was rerouted onto a bypass route), and crosses the Ohio River into Brown County, Ohio, where it meets the main alignment of US 68.

History
In eastern McCracken and into southern Livingston and northern Lyon Counties, US 62 originally followed US 60 east of Paducah to Smithland, where it turned right using present-day alignments of KY 453 and KY 93 to Eddyville. That segment of US 62 was rerouted to its current location before the end of the 1930s. 

Until 1963, US 62 followed a route from Kuttawa, into what was the inner part of Eddyville, and followed a due easterly path to Princeton via Saratoga Springs. This original alignment is now parts of Kentucky Routes 93 and KY 293, while US 62 was rerouted onto the former KY 278, where it meets up with US 641, and to provide a proper intersection with the Western Kentucky Parkway west of Princeton.

When I-24's route through Kentucky was completed at some time between 1976 and 1979, US 62's junction with the WK Parkway was closed off as a result of the extension project to extend the WK Parkway to Eddyville to build its western terminus at I-24's exit 42 interchange. The original connector is still in existence as a county-maintained road, with a dead end where the connector connected to the parkway where the Mile Marker 10 toll booth was originally located until 1987.

In the early 2010s, a section of US 62 in western Anderson County was reconstructed to accommodate the new intersection with KY 555, which was extended from its junction with the Bluegrass Parkway in northern Washington County. US 62's junction with KY 248 was also reconstructed.

In Harrison County, US 62 previously followed a route east of Cynthiana to start its concurrentcy with US 68 just south of Blue Lick State Park until it was rerouted to its current course to Maysville prior to 1940.

Major intersections

Memorial names
From the KY 189 junction to the eastern city limits in Central City, US 62 is known as Everly Brothers Boulevard, in honor of the country music duo who were born and raised in the area.

Related routes
Kentucky Route 293 
U.S. Route 27 Business (Cynthiana, Kentucky) 
U.S. Route 62 Truck (Elizabethtown, Kentucky) 
U.S. Route 62 Truck (Lawrenceburg, Kentucky)

See also

References

External links

US 62 at KentuckyRoads.com

 Kentucky
062
Transportation in Ballard County, Kentucky
Transportation in Carlisle County, Kentucky
Transportation in McCracken County, Kentucky
Transportation in Marshall County, Kentucky
Transportation in Livingston County, Kentucky
Transportation in Lyon County, Kentucky
Transportation in Caldwell County, Kentucky
Transportation in Hopkins County, Kentucky
Transportation in Muhlenberg County, Kentucky
Transportation in Ohio County, Kentucky
Transportation in Grayson County, Kentucky
Transportation in Hardin County, Kentucky
Transportation in Nelson County, Kentucky
Transportation in Anderson County, Kentucky
Transportation in Woodford County, Kentucky
Transportation in Scott County, Kentucky
Transportation in Bourbon County, Kentucky
Transportation in Harrison County, Kentucky
Transportation in Robertson County, Kentucky
Transportation in Mason County, Kentucky